Fraserburgh (or) is a town in Aberdeenshire, Scotland with a population recorded in the 2011 Census at 13,100. Fraserburgh is also a major port for white and pelagic fish.

History

16th and 17th century: Origins
The name of the town means, literally, 'burgh of Fraser', after the Fraser family that bought the lands of Philorth in 1504 and thereafter brought about major improvement due to investment over the next century. 

By 1570, the Fraser family had built Fraserburgh Castle at Kinnaird Head and within a year a church was built for the area. Sir Alexander Fraser built a port in the town in 1579, obtained a charter establishing it as a burgh of barony in 1588 and secured the right to change the name from Faithlie to Fraserburgh in 1592.

A grant from the Parliament of Scotland in 1595 allowed Sir Alexander Fraser to erect the first college building, and in 1597 the General Assembly of the Church of Scotland recommended the Rev. Charles Ferme, then minister at the Old Parish, to be its first and only principal.

In 1601, Fraserburgh became a burgh of regality. The college, however, closed only a decade or so after Ferme's arrest on the orders of James VI for taking part in the 1605 General Assembly of Aberdeen, being used again only for a short time in 1647 when King's College, Aberdeen temporarily relocated owing to an outbreak of plague. A plaque commemorating the University's existence may be seen at the Fraserburgh Heritage Centre.

18th and 19th century: further growth and development
During the 18th and 19th centuries the population of Fraserburgh was growing with peaks due to seasonal employment. From a population of an estimated 1682 in 1755, a population of about 2,000 was recorded in 1780, of whom 1,000 resided in the town proper. There were a further 200 people in the village of Broadsea.

In 1787, Fraserburgh Castle was converted to Kinnaird Head Lighthouse, Scotland's first mainland lighthouse and the first in Scotland to be lit by the Commissioners of Northern Lights.

In the 1790s, Rev. Alexander Simpson of the Fraserburgh Old Parish Church describes the harbour as small but good, telling that it had the capability to take vessels with '200 tons burden'. The Reverend notes that shipbuilding had become a main industry in the town, especially after 1784, and that the locals were making donations and seeking government assistance to have the harbour enlarged.

In 1803, the original 1571 church building was replaced and enlarged, to a design by Alexander Morrice, to seat 1,000 people. The Auld Kirk was to be the standing authority in the town up until the 1840s. This period also saw the extension of the harbour, with a northern pier of 300 yards being built between 1807–1812 and, in 1818, a southern pier being built following an Act of Parliament.

Fraserburgh's population boomed in the early 19th Century, from 2271 in 1811 to 2954 by 1831. This was primarily put down to the growth in herring fishing, which intensified in 1815. The herring season also brought with it an additional 1,200 people working in the Parish. Contemporary accounts mention the increase in general wealth brought by this increased trade spurring a change in dress and diet as well as a considerable amount of new houses being built in the town.

Fraserburgh Town House, which was designed by Thomas Mackenzie of Matthews and MacKenzie, was completed in 1855.

Lifeboat service
The town has had a local lifeboat on service since 1806 which was run privately by the local Harbour Board until the first RNLI operated station opened in 1858. This was the first official RNLI station opened in Scotland.

Throughout the 20th century, Fraserburgh suffered three lifeboat disasters. First, in 1919, the 'Lady Rothes' capsized while assisting HM drifter Eminent. Coxswain Andrew Noble and Acting Second Coxswain Andrew Faquhar drowned. Second, on 9 February 1953, six crew members lost their lives when the lifeboat capsized while escorting fishing vessels to the harbour. On this occasion Coxswain Andrew Ritchie, Mechanic George Duthie, Bowman Charles Tait, Assistant Mechanic James Noble and Crew Members John Crawford and John Buchan all lost their lives - the only survivor was Charles Tait. Lastly, on 21 January 1970 while on service to the Danish fishing vessel Opal, the lifeboat The Duchess of Kent capsized with the loss of five of her crew of six. Those killed were Coxswain John Stephen, Mechanic Frederick Kirkness and crew members William Hadden, James R.S. Buchan and James Buchan.

In 2009, a local campaign was started to raise £40,000 to erect an official monument to the 14 men who lost their lives whilst serving on the Fraserburgh Lifeboat. The target was successfully achieved and the monument unveiled by Flora Fraser, 21st Lady Saltoun in August 2010.

Railways
Fraserburgh railway station opened in 1865 and closed to passengers in 1965. The railway line was built by the Formartine and Buchan Railway Company, which became part of the Great North of Scotland Railway. Trains operated to Aberdeen via Maud and Dyce, as well as a short branch line to St Combs via Cairnbulg. In 1923 the GNSR was incorporated into the London and North Eastern Railway, which was in turn nationalised on 1 January 1948. Passenger services on the Buchan lines were withdrawn in 1965 as part of the Beeching cuts, although freight trains continued to operate Fraserburgh until 1979. The track was subsequently lifted.

Following the opening of the Borders Railway in September 2015, Fraserburgh became the most distant town in UK from the rail network, leading to calls for the lifted track to be reinstated.

Climate
Fraserburgh has a marine climate heavily influenced by its proximity to the sea. As such, summer highs and winter lows are heavily moderated, with mild winter temperatures for a location so far north.

As a result of its marine influence, there is significant seasonal lag, with September being milder than June, and October having slightly milder nights than May, in spite of a considerable difference in the length of daylight. The climate is overcast and wet with and average of 1,351.8 hours of sunshine per year.

Fraserburgh is also notable for having the highest ever recorded wind speed in the UK at a low altitude. The  gust was recorded on 13 February 1989 at Kinnaird Head Lighthouse.

Demographics
The 2011 census recorded 13,180 residents making Fraserburgh the third largest settlement in Aberdeenshire after Peterhead and Inverurie. Since the accession of Poland and other eastern European countries to the European Union in 2004, there has been an influx of EU citizens to the town, with 5% of residents now speaking Polish as their first language, and a further 6% speaking other languages.

Some 10% of residents stated the Scots language to be their primary language used at home, whilst 63.1% reported being able to speak it.

Places of interest
The town has several attractions including an award-winning beach, a major commercial harbour, Kinnaird Head Lighthouse, the Museum of Scottish Lighthouses, Fraserburgh Heritage Centre and the community war memorial by the Scottish sculptor Alexander Carrick.

Fraserburgh is also home to a variety 19th century churches, each in its own distinct style. This includes: Fraserburgh Baptist Church; Fraserburgh Old Parish Church (the oldest); Our Lady, Star of the Sea Roman Catholic Church; South Church; St Peter's Episcopal Church; and West Church.

Photo gallery

Sports and recreation 

Fraserburgh has a number of sporting facilities including a swimming pool, ten-pin bowling alley, tennis courts, martial arts dojo, skatepark and football pitches.

Golf 
Founded in 1777, Fraserburgh Golf Club is the fifth oldest club in Scotland and seventh oldest in the world. It has both an 18-hole and a 9-hole course, and a modern clubhouse. Nearby is the Dunes Golf Centre public driving range and cafe.

Football 
Fraserburgh Football Club is a senior football club that plays in the Highland League, of which they are the current champions, having secured their 4th title in April 2022. Fraserburgh United F.C. is a junior football club that plays in the Scottish Junior Football North First Division.

Cricket 
Fraserburgh Cricket Club was founded in 1862 and currently competes in the Aberdeenshire Grades Leagues. They play their home matches at Kessock Park. The club celebrated their 150th anniversary in 2012 and in the same year succeeded in gaining promotion to Grade 2.

In 2013, the Club won the Bon Accord Cup for only the second time in their history with a close but in the end comfortable victory over Knightriders CC, thanks to a man of the match performance from Fraser Lawrance, bowling 5-6 off ten overs. In 2014, Fraserburgh Cricket Club gained promotion to Grade 1 by finishing second in Grade 2, meaning that they would play in the top tier of the Aberdeenshire Grades for the first time since 1975.

The club were relegated to Grade 2 in 2015, and have remained there to the present.

In 2018 the club won the Bon Accord Cup for a third time, in a re-vamp T20 competition, at Mannofield Cricket Ground, beating Gordonians. Chris Gospel winning the Man of the Match for his impactful contributions in the game.

Transportation

Road 
Fraserburgh is situated at the northern end of the A90 road. It is served by buses, including the Buchan Express to Aberdeen and a town service numbered 76 and 77.

Harbour 
Fraserburgh is a major white fish port and busy commercial harbour. The harbour has a six berth slipway facility, storm gates, a large drydock, and fully refrigerated fish market facilities.

The Apostleship of the Sea, a seafarers charity, has a port chaplain in Fraserburgh.

Education
The town has a variety of educational establishments, including four primary schools (Fraserburgh North School, Fraserburgh South Park School, Lochpots School, St Andrew's School), a secondary school (Fraserburgh Academy), a SEN school (Westfield School), and a campus of a college of further education (North East Scotland College).

For the short-lived Fraserburgh University see above under History.

Fraserburgh Academy
The original academy building was opened in 1909. A new, more modern, school was built in the 1950s, and the original building was repurposed to house the academy's art and drama departments. The school has had many successes these past few years including having several of its pupils gaining prizes over a number of years in a nationwide photography competition - Focus Environment.

In early 2009, a group of MPs from the Scottish Parliament held a petition committee meeting in the school. Also in early 2009, the art department of the school organised commemorate photo exhibition in memory of Glover's early years of living in Fraserburgh. These photos were displayed throughout the town, and some of the photos are being used as part of the Homecoming Scotland campaign. See article - Thomas Blake Glover

In September 2009, the school had a visit from the Poet Laureate Carol Ann Duffy who gave a speech to pupils from the school and others from the whole of Aberdeenshire.

Religion 
Christianity is the prevalent religion in Fraserburgh and it is home to many congregations from a wide variety of Christian denominations. This includes three Church of Scotland congregations and four Pentecostal congregations (Elim Pentecostal, Assembly of God, Calvary Chapel and Emmanuel Christian Fellowship). Additionally, there are also congregations of Baptists, Roman Catholics, Scottish Episcopalians, Evangelists, Congregationalists, Brethren, Jehovah's Witnesses and Salvationists.

Fraserburgh Junior Arts Society 
In 1952 the Fraserburgh Photographic Society staged a pantomime, “Humpty Dumpty”, to raise funds for equipment. The pantomime was so successful that the following year some of the members came together and formed the Fraserburgh Junior Arts Society. The object of the Society being to encourage young people in the Arts. The society conducts pantomimes, plays, musicals and variety theatre, and has also been involved in all the major community events in Fraserburgh. Back in 1957 the society organised the formation of the Swimming Pool Fund after several fatalities at the beach, the project was subsequently adopted by Aberdeenshire Council resulting in Fraserburgh swimming pool’s completion in 1969. During the 1960s and 70s the Society participated in and organised events in the local annual gala. Some former members have gone on to make drama, music or dance their career after more formal training at institutes like University of West London, University of Aberdeen, the Royal Conservatoire of Scotland, MGA, Telford College, Trinity College, the University of Northampton and the London College of Music.

Notable people

 Sir George Anderson(1845-1923): born in Fraserburgh, knighted by King Edward VII, 1905, treasurer of the Bank of Scotland. The Bank of Scotland building at the corner of Frithside Street was named Anderson House after him. He gifted bequests to Fraserburgh: the clocks in the steeple of the South United Free Church (now Fraserburgh South Church), the stained glass windows in the High Kirk in honour of his parents and the Gold Dux Medal he donated to Fraserburgh Academy His wife gifted the Bishop's Chair and Credence Table to St Peter's Episcopal Church in 1909.
George Bruce (1909–2002): Poet of the Scottish literary renaissance
Robert Bruce OBE (1911-1999): diplomat and Oriental scholar 
Felicity Buchan (1970 - ), Conservative MP for Kensington, Investment Banker. 
James Cardno (1912 – 1975) was a Scottish bobsledder. He won the bronze medal in the four-man event at the 1936 Winter Olympics in Garmisch-Partenkirchen, Germany. 
Patrick Gray Cheves (1820 –1883): a farmer in Norway, Wisconsin who served two terms as a member of the Wisconsin State Assembly from Racine County, Wisconsin. 
William Cheyne (1912–1988) sometimes known as Andy Cheyne:  was a Scottish footballer, playing for Rangers and Motherwell.  
John Christie (1929 – 2014): a football goalkeeper who played for Southampton F.C. for most of the 1950s.  
 John Cranna (c.1853 - 1932): Harbour Treasurer and author of "Fraserburgh Past and Present" (Rosemount Press, 1914).
Harry Cruden (1895–1967): Founder of Crudens Ltd, creator of postwar prefabricated housing, founder of the Cruden Foundation (1964). 
 Henry Duthie MBE (1923-2020): founding member of Fraserburgh Junior Arts Society, Boys' Brigade stalwart, and Chairman of Fraserburgh 400.
Steve Fairnie (1951–1993): Fraserburgh born musician, painter, sculptor, actor, board game designer, chicken hypnotist, frontman of the post-punk band Writz and half of the Techno Twins.
 Rev. Charles Ferm (c.1565–1617): born in Edinburgh; Minister of Fraserburgh Old Parish Church (1598–1617), Principal of the University of Fraserburgh. A notable rebel minister against Episcopacy.
Gordon Mitchell Forsyth (1879-1952) Fraserburgh born artist. Known mainly for his work in ceramics, he tutored many artists at the Burslem School of art including Clarice Cliff and Susie Cooper.
Alexander Fraser, 11th Lord Saltoun (1604 – 1693): Scottish peer and the 10th Laird of Philorth.
General Sir John Fraser, GCH (1760 – 1843): British Army officer.
William Fraser, 12th Lord Saltoun (1654–1715): born in Philorth; voted against ratifying the Treaty of Union.
Bill Gibb (1943–1988): born near Fraserburgh; became international fashion designer.
Thomas Blake Glover (1838–1911): born in Fraserburgh, where his father worked for the coastguard, moved to Japan and assisted in the introduction of modern industries. He remained in the country as a consultant to the Mitsubishi Company and died in Tokyo, a legend in his time.
Sir William Henderson (1826 –1904) was a Scottish merchant, Lord Provost of Aberdeen,  and philanthropist.
 Alice Irvine (1935- )Giving the town of Fraserburgh 40 years of voluntary services to the community with her work with Fraserburgh Junior Arts Society and other groups over the past 40 years.
Charles Jarvis (VC) (1881–1948): Recipient of the Victoria Cross.
Archibald Russell Johnstone (known as Archie Johnstone) (1896 - 1963): Scottish journalist, hotelier and humanitarian, who defected to the Soviet Union.
Finlay Kennedy (1892 - 1925): Scottish International Rugby Union Player.
Patrick "Pat" King (1944-2022): a Scottish bassist, best known for his association with Manfred Mann's Earth Band.
Robertson Macaulay (1833–1915): one-time president of Sun Life Assurance Company of Canada.
Colonel William McConnachie of Knowsie, JP (1848–1932): businessman, local politician and Provost of Fraserburgh.
Charles Rawden Maclean (1815–1880), alias "John Ross" opponent of slavery, was born in Fraserburgh.
Sandra Malley (1947-2018), psychologist and Gaelic scholar
Jamie Masson (born 1993): Scottish semi-professional footballer who has played for Aberdeen, Formartine United, Elgin City, Brechin City and other clubs.
George Fowlie Merson FRSE FPS FCS (1866–1959): Scottish pharmacist who produced an artificial surgical catgut called Mersuture.
Major Harold J. Milne OBE MC DL JP (1889–1963): Provost of Fraserburgh, First Freeman of the Burgh of Fraserburgh.
Stanley Watt Morrice (born 1963), MBE
David Donald Murison (1913 - 1997): Lexicographer, Editor of the Scottish National Dictionary. 
John Murray (1879 - 1964): Educationalist, Liberal Politician. 
Dennis Nilsen (1945–2018): serial killer; born at Academy Road, Fraserburgh; committed his murders in London in the five years leading up to his arrest in 1983.
James Ramsay (1733–89): born in Fraserburgh; anti-slavery campaigner.
Reid, John [pseudonym David Toulmin] (1913–1998): Author of novels, short stories and journalism, many based on North East farming life. 
Sir Lewis Duthie Ritchie OBE FRCOG FRSE FRCGP FFPH FBCS FRSA (1952-) Born in Fraserburgh. Medical doctor and researcher, and James McKenzie Professor of General Practice at the University of Aberdeen.
Frederick Stewart (1836–1889): educationist and colonial administrator in Hong Kong. 
Sir George Strahan (1838–87): British colonial governor.
Robert Tindall (1820-1918): founded Tindall's ironmongery in Fraserburgh in 1841 before expanding the business to Buckie where the company had an engineering shop and a buoy and oilskin factory. Buoys were distributed from there all over England and exported to Norway. The business finally expanded to new premises in Forres. He was the last surviving elder in Scotland of the 1843 Disruption of the Kirk.
Craig Watson (born 1995): Scottish professional footballer who plays as a defender or midfielder for Airdrieonians.
Christian Watt (1833–1923): author of "The Christian Watt Papers"
Alexander Webster (1841-1913, active 1875-1888): artist, specialising in local views a number of which are on display in Fraserburgh Library. He frequently had paintings hung in the Royal Scottish Academy. He was found drowned in Fraserburgh harbour in 1913 aged 72.
Marion Katherine Wilberforce [née Ogilvie-Forbes] (1902–1995): Aviator. Flew Hurricanes, Spitfires and other aircraft for the Air Transport Auxiliary;  one of only eleven women qualified to fly the four-engine Lancaster and Stirling bombers.

Twin towns
 Bressuire, France

References

External links

Fraserburgh Junior Arts Society 
 Fraserburgh: Scotland's leading light
 Fraserburgh Heritage Centre
 Banff and Buchan College
 Cairness House
 Buchan hillwalking club
 Historian's pages on the fishing villages of the North East
 Fraserburgh Leisure Centre — featuring local cuisine, bar, and family entertainment
 Museum of Scottish lighthouses — the first lighthouse built on mainland Scotland
 Alexander Carrick, sculptor of war memorial
 Fraserburgh Photographic Society

 
Towns in Aberdeenshire
Ports and harbours of Scotland
Port cities and towns of the North Sea
Fishing communities in Scotland
Populated coastal places in Scotland